Health Insurance Plan of New Jersey or HIP of New Jersey was a Health Maintenance Organization in New Jersey that was declared insolvent in 1998 and filed for bankruptcy in 1999. The bankruptcy left some people with no insurance coverage. Jaynee LaVecchia, the State Commissioner of Banking and Insurance, proposed legislation to create a fund to pay the costs of future HMO failures in New Jersey. The company offered a range of health insurance plans for individuals, families, and small businesses, including HMO, PPO, and EPO plans. HIPNJ also offers a range of additional services, such as wellness programs and resources for managing chronic conditions.

History
In 1997, the health maintenance organization entered into an asset purchase agreement with PHP Healthcare Corporation of Reston, Virginia (PHP), a Delaware for-profit corporation. In 1999, the company went bankrupt when the $120 million they were owed by Pinnacle Health Enterprises was never paid.

References

Health maintenance organizations
Companies based in New Brunswick, New Jersey
American companies disestablished in 1999
Medical and health organizations based in New Jersey
1999 disestablishments in New Jersey